Dønna is the largest island in Dønna Municipality in Nordland county, Norway.  The  island lies off the west coast of the mainland of Helgeland, Norway.  The islands of Løkta and Tomma lie northeast of the island, the islands of Vandve and Åsvær lie to the west, and the islands of Herøy and Alsta lie to the south.

The island is the main island of the municipality where most of the municipal residents live. In 2017, there were about 1,235 residents on the island. The northern and central parts of the island are low and relatively flat, partly marshy which nice coastal beaches. The southern part of Dønna is mountainous with several steep and bare mountains.

The island is only connected to the mainland by ferry connections with the nearby town of Sandnessjøen (and to the neighboring island of Løkta).  Dønna is connected to the island of Staulen (in Herøy Municipality) by the Åkviksundet Bridge on the southern tip of the island.

See also
List of islands of Norway

References

Dønna
Islands of Nordland